Live is a double album by Natalie MacMaster, released in 2002 on the Rounder Records label.

Track listing
Disc one – In Concert (recorded at the Living Arts Center, Mississauga, Ontario)
 "Farewell" – 7:46
 "Fairy Dance" – 5:05
 "Torna a Surriento" – 5:31
 "Bog a Lochan Steps" – 3:06
 "Blue Bonnets" – 4:36
 "Welcome to Trossachs" – 7:08
 "David's Jig" – 4:28
 "Tullochgorum" – 9:56
 "The A Medley" – 9:55
 "The Encore" – 6:22

Disc two – Glencoe Dance (recorded at the Glencoe Mills Hall, Glencoe Mills, Cape Breton)
 "Natalie's Intro" – 0:33
 "Opening Figure" – 3:56
 "Second Figure" – 4:44
 "Lively Steps" – 8:26
 "Jerry Tunes" – 3:11
 "Pipe Jigs" – 3:49
 "Grand Promenade" – 7:44
 "Stepdancer's Queue" – 7:07
 "...One Good Holler" – 2:29

References

Natalie MacMaster albums
2002 live albums
Live albums by Canadian artists